St David's Marist is a private English medium Roman Catholic preparatory and high school for boys in Inanda, a suburb of Johannesburg, South Africa. The school was established in 1941 by the Marist Brothers.

History 
The school's roots began in post-revolution France. The Marist Order, also known as the Little Brothers of Mary, was founded by the Father Marcellin Champagnat to educate young children, especially the neglected or those suffering from poverty. The order has since spread throughout the world. The Order arrived in Johannesburg in 1889, three years after the founding of the city. They were among the first to establish a boys' school in the little mining town that was to become the centre of business and finance in South Africa. The location was at Koch St in downtown Johannesburg.

A second school was established in Observatory but it became apparent that the school premises in Koch St were becoming inadequate as the city grew and encroached on the property. Additional property was sought for a new school. Land was purchased in Inanda, then a semi-rural area north of Johannesburg, and building commenced in 1940. St David's opened in 1941 as a private boarding school, and by 1953 the school had 475 pupils, 200 of them being boarders. In 1963 the school acquired another 45 acres (18 hectares) of land, making it the largest Marist establishment in South Africa.

Marcellin Champagnat was canonised in 1999. His legacy lives on at St David's as it does at all Marist schools. The educational philosophy of Champagnat was simple: "To teach children one must love them and love them equally. I cannot see a child without wanting to tell them how much God loves them."

St David's today 
As of 2022, the school has 1,300 pupils. The school is separated into Junior Preparatory (Grade 00 and grade 0), Preparatory (Grades 1–7) and High School (Grades 8–12). The Preparatory School has 640 boys and the high school 650 boys. The school has continued to expand over the last few years with the addition of new classrooms, as well as media, music, art, sports and technology centres.

Houses 
Pupils are divided among eight houses: The Bishops House (yellow), Osmond House (blue), Benedict House (green), College House (red), Jude House (grey), Selima House (black), Plaatje House (purple), and Daswa House (orange). The houses compete against each other in athletic, cultural and academic competitions. College House is the holder of the Owen Sims Shield for the overall Interhouse competitions throughout the Preparatory and High School as well as the House Cup for the top house in the High School.

Uniform 
Students wear a navy blue blazer with vertical gold stripes and a navy blue tie with diagonal gold stripes. The Marist Monogram (an intertwined "A.M." for "Ave Maria") appears on the pocket of the blazer. A "Half Colours" tie is awarded to students excelling in academics or any of the school's sports, cultural, or service activities. The tie is solid navy blue with the school crest and the name of the sport or area in which they have excelled. It is worn instead of the standard school tie. Similar ties are worn by the School Prefects. "Full Colours" are awarded to individuals who distinguish themselves as being one of the best in their sport or other disciplines. Students who have been awarded their full colours wear the scroll on their school blazer underneath the pocket. 

The highest honour that can be given to a student is the "Honours Blazer". There are two ways to gain this award, namely General Honours and Specific Honours. A student needs full colours in three of the five categories (Sport, Academics, Service, Cultural and Leadership) to be awarded General Honours. Specific Honours is awarded for unusual excellence in one specific field, for example national or provincial representation in a sport. The blazer is automatically awarded to the Head Prefect each year. It is light and royal blue with gold stripes, and has the school's crest on the pocket.

Hierarchy and student structures 
The Matrics (grade 12) constitute the leadership body of the school, known as the Matric Leadership Group. Between twelve and fourteen grade 11 boys are elected by the school in October to constitute the Prefect body for the following year. They take over the leadership of the school in mid-October when the Matrics commence their study leave. Three weeks later, at Prize-Giving, a Head Prefect and Deputy Head Prefect are announced. Matrics who are not prefects can be elected into positions of heads of portfolio within their houses. Portfolios include Sport, Cultural, Spirit, Academic, Environment, Public Relations, Mentor and House Secretary. There are also positions as Grade Co-ordinators. Matrics who demonstrate leadership qualities during their Matric year are eligible to be awarded a Leadership Scroll.

Sporting tradition 
Students participate in summer and winter sports, teams are arranged according to age groups (Under 14, 15, 16 and Open) to compete against other schools. The primary sports in the high school are rugby union, cricket, soccer, swimming, waterpolo and hockey. In winter, the school fields about 15 rugby teams and 13 hockey teams every week. The school also has tennis, canoeing, cross country and basketball. The school colours are navy blue and gold, but it is a tradition that first teams wear black and gold. 

The sports that are offered in the school are:

 Athletics
 Basketball
 Canoeing
 Cricket
 Cross country
Football (soccer)
 Golf
 Hockey
Orienteering 
 Rugby
Rock climbing
 Swimming
 Tennis
 Water polo

Cultural tradition 
The school has choirs, bands and private instrument tuition. Annual events include inter-House music and play competitions, as well as yearly major dramatic productions.

The St David's Marist Foundation 
St David's Marist Foundation was established in 2006 and its first objective is to establish an Endowment Fund, which will provide financial resources to the School in perpetuity. The Endowment capital is invested to achieve long term capital growth and provide funding for priorities identified by the school board of governors and the board of trustees. 

Foremost among the foundation's priorities is providing bursaries and scholarships to deserving boys from disadvantaged backgrounds. To this end, each year the foundation awards 4–6% of its opening capital to qualifying programs. St David's Marist Foundation/UK Charity is an extension of our Foundation and is registered as an official charity with the UK Charity Commission. The SDMF UK Charity is able to accept and channel donations from UK based donors to the benefit of St David's Marist, Inanda.

Marist Old Boys Society 
The school's alumni organisation falls under the constitution set out by the Marist Old Boys Society or MOBS. Entrance to the society is automatic upon matriculation from a Marist school and not limited to just St David's old boys. The administration, Annual General Meeting and committee majority is, however, dominated by old boys of St David's and all of these functions are hosted by the school itself. The MOBS committee has worked closely with The Foundation and with the PTA in a number of fund raising events. The MOBS serve a number of alumni functions including data-base management, communications and reunion co-ordination as well as identifying and reporting the successes of past students in their personal lives and careers.

Notable alumni 
Temba Bavuma – South African cricketer, plays for the Proteas and the Highveld Lions. Temba made his debut for South Africa against the West Indies in 2014.
Giulio Giuricich – South African soccer player, plays For Moroka Swallows. 
Dominic Hendricks – South African cricketer, plays for the Highveld Lions.
Pumelela Matshikwe – South African cricketer, plays for the Highveld Lions.

References 

Schools in Johannesburg
Educational institutions established in 1941
Marist Brothers schools
Private schools in Gauteng
1941 establishments in South Africa
Christianity in Johannesburg